Constellium SE is a global manufacturer of aluminium rolled products, extruded products, and structural parts based on a large variety of advanced alloys. Constellium's C-TEC research center has been credited for advancing technology in the field of advanced aluminium alloys. Constellium primarily serves the aerospace, automotive, and packaging sectors. Large clients include Mercedes-Benz, Audi, BMW, Fiat Chrysler Automotive, Ford, Airbus, Boeing, and Bombardier.

History 
Constellium was created when Rio Tinto sold off Alcan Engineered Products to Apollo Management (51%) and FSI (10%) in 2011. Prior to that, Alcan Engineered Products was the result of various mergers and acquisitions between Pechiney, Alcan and Alusuisse. Constellium is listed on the New York Stock Exchange. In February 2018, Constellium delisted its shares from Euronext Paris.

In December 2020, workers at a Constellium-owned plant in Muscle Shoals, Alabama went on strike following a failure to agree to new labor contracts.

Operations 
Constellium counts close to 12,500 employees worldwide and operates more than 28 manufacturing sites in North America, Europe and Asia. The company is headquartered in Paris with corporate offices in Baltimore and Zurich.

Research centers 
Founded in 1967, Constellium's C-TEC Technology Center is a research and development center designed to promote innovation in aluminum. Located in Voreppe, France, C-TEC maintains a staff of over 200 R&D technicians and engineers. During the last 50 years, C-TEC has added more than 600 patent families and trademarks, including breakthrough innovations in aluminium alloy for aerospace, automotive, and packaging, including, high performance aluminium-lithium alloy for air-and spacecraft, high-strength aluminium alloys for structural components in the automotive industry, aluminium solutions for aerosols that can lighten products by 30 percent and high-tech aluminium profiles for hybrid motors.

Launched in 2013, the Advanced Light Metals Processing Research Center, a collaboration between Constellium, Brunel University and Jaguar Land Rover, was opened as an innovation center dedicated to the automotive industry. In 2016, the partnership between Constellium and Brunel was extended with the opening of the Constellium University Technology Center (UTC), a research center for the design, development and prototyping of aluminium alloys and automotive structural components. In 2016, Constellium opened an additional research hub dedicated to lightweight automotive aluminium in Plymouth, Michigan.

Sustainability in aluminium industry 
Constellium participates in numerous associations and initiatives aimed at improving sustainability in the aluminium industry. In 2012, the Group founded a Sustainability Council to choose sustainability targets, track performance and ensure accurate disclosure of data in alignment with the Global Reporting Initiative, Carbon Disclosure Project, and United Nations Global Compact. The company is also a founding member of the Aluminium Stewardship Initiative (ASI), a global, multi-stakeholder, non-profit organization for the aluminium industry. ASI sets standards across the entire aluminium value chain, including in areas such as mining, greenhouse gas emissions, waste management, material stewardship, biodiversity, human rights, and responsible strategic sourcing.

With plants in Muscle Shoals, Alabama, and Neuf-Brisach, France, the company has the capacity to recycle the equivalent of 23 billion cans a year. The company also works with the European Aluminium Association, the US Aluminum Association, and the Can Manufacturers Institute to increase beverage can recycling. In particular, the company supports the European aluminium industry's target to reach an 80 percent beverage can recycling rate by 2020.

References

External links

Aluminium companies of France
Companies based in Paris
Companies established in 2011
Companies formerly listed on the London Stock Exchange
Companies listed on the New York Stock Exchange
French brands